Amata huebneri, the wasp moth, is a moth in the genus Amata of the family Erebidae (subfamily Arctiinae - "woolly bears" or "tiger moths"). The species was first described by Jean Baptiste Boisduval in 1829. It is found from the Indo Australian tropics to northern Australia.

Adults are black with yellow bands across the abdomen, and transparent windows in the wings. It is a wasp mimic.

The larvae have been recorded feeding on Oryza sativa, Mikania micrantha, Oxalis barrelieri and Ipomoea batatas but can also eat decomposing matter and protein rich matter.

References 

Moths described in 1828
huebneri
Moths of Australia
Moths of Asia
Arctiinae